The Wallenquist Organization is a criminal organization in the fictional universe of Frank Miller's Sin City. It is led by Herr Wallenquist, a German-American (though the name is actually Swedish) mobster shrouded in mystery. The organization has a broad base of criminal enterprise to its name, including drug smuggling, contract killing, racketeering, organ harvesting and human trafficking for the purpose of illegal adoption and slavery, as well as having many city officials on their payroll at one time or the other. They employ scores of mercenaries, including former IRA members, and implied Neo-Nazis.

Leadership
Herr Alarich Wallenquist / The Kraut, is the mysterious and powerful leader of the organization. His goal is merely to achieve power and profit, regardless of what underhanded methods can lead him to that goal. His stature is consistent with his power, as he is portrayed as being an enormous and imposing man who is of greater size and physical bulk than even Marv. Unlike the other antagonists, he acts measured and thoughtful, as he sees revenge as an unnecessary extravagance and will often take losses with a fair amount of dignity when hostile action will serve no practical purpose. In "Hell and Back" he is more than willing to allow Wallace to leave in his own words "And hope to never see them again". In the same book he shows confidence that his organization will be able to bribe Liebowitz to work for them again. He also proves to be one of the few men able to resist Ava Lord's wiles (going so far as to mock her, pointing out that her sexual allure is her only great weapon and that she wields it clumsily, affecting men in ways that do not aid her, such as Mort), and is rarely directly involved with the perpetration of his organization's crimes. In one of his rare appearances, it can be seen that his face and neck is heavily marked with scars or burns. It is rumoured that he may be the mysterious man known only as 'The Janitor' seen executing an escaped Nazi in 'Rats', but this has not been confirmed in-universe.

Enforcers
The Colonel is an enforcer and captain for Wallenquist. He trains and coordinates assassins in the organisation's employ, as well as being one himself at some point. He runs the organisation's organ harvesting and human trafficking ring as well as other ventures. His operations are eventually shut down by the Basin City Police in a sting operation at the conclusion of the Hell and Back arc; he then is captured and shot by Commissioner Liebowitz for threatening his family. In the movie continuity, it is believed that he was "The Salesman" from the Sin City short story The Customer is Always Right. This was previously confirmed in the one-shot Sex & Violence when a fan noticed that The Colonel and The Salesman have the same haircut and inquired about it to Frank Miller in the letter section "BLAM!".

Manute, a huge enforcer who dresses like a valet, and acts very gentlemanly in all situations, even while committing homicide. He initially served Ava Lord and, following her death at the hands of Dwight McCarthy, was later recruited by the Colonel and Wallenquist. He is also nigh indestructible, having been crucified (by Miho), shot repeatedly (by Dwight) and savagely beaten numerous times (by Marv and Wallace). The only lasting injury he received was from Marv, who gouged out his right eye. It was later replaced by a fake golden one. Manute was then put in charge of securing the corpse of Jackie-Boy to instigate a war between the police and the girls of Old Town, allowing Wallenquist to make a power grab for Old Town in the meantime; however, he was finally gunned down by the hookers of Old Town during 'The Big Fat Kill'. In the deleted scenes of the movie adaptation, he was shown to have momentarily escaped from the assault with Schutz and another thug, only to be sliced down the middle by Miho in an alleyway moments later.

Assassins
Delia / "Blue Eyes", a trained assassin hired by The Colonel. She uses the powers of seduction to lead unsuspecting men to their deaths. She usually has sex with her victims before killing them.  She was unable to seduce Wallace and later calls him a Monk before Maxine drugs him and Gordo pushes the car down a cliff. She herself is killed by Wallace, despite begging for her life.

Mariah, a trained assassin in league with Delia, although apparently less skilled. She, too, uses the powers of seduction, but can also fight with a bo (staff).  She does manage to seduce and injure Liebowitz's son Josh by breaking his arms. Despite her combat training Wallace easily beats her, breaking her nose in the process. She works for Wallenquist and she managed to escape from Liebowitz's assault on the factory. She was seen later asking to go after Wallace, which she is denied with Wallenquist saying there is no profit in revenge. Has a penchant for leopard print clothing.

Gordo, The Colonel's muscle. Works alongside Delia to try and set-up Wallace's death. He serves as the muscle and can push a car and shoot a gun but seemed to barely be able to carry Wallace. He seems to has limited intelligence and speaks in the third person. On a humorous note he once commented Wallace had a big penis. He was killed by Wallace after he mortally shot Captain.

Others
Bruno, a former hitman and politician on Wallenquist's payroll. His murder at the hands of the Mafia, and the collateral damage that ensued, set Dwight on a mission to find his murderer.

Becky, a young Old Town prostitute who is instrumental in getting Jackie Boy killed by Miho. She also works for the Colonel as a spy, mainly because she didn't want her mother to discover that she was a prostitute, partly because he offered her a considerable sum of money and a new life. She's shot along with Manute during 'The Big Fat Kill'. In the epilogue of the movie adaptation, it is implied she is killed by the Salesman while leaving the hospital.

Maxine, a psychopharmacologist who works alongside Delia. She administers a strong hallucinogen into Wallace's system, and later gives him the antidote at gunpoint, but she is killed when Wallace accidentally shoots her. She was also involved in Esther's attempted brainwashing.

Dr. Fredric, a doctor in league with the Colonel. Kidnaps and overpowers Esther under the Colonel's orders after incapacitating Wallace with narcotics in Hell and Back. Mariah kills him and his companion, Orrin, to make sure that Wallace doesn't extract any valuable information from him.

Orrin, Doctor Fredric's assistant and lover. Shoots and incapacitates Wallace with a strong tranquilliser whilst he and Fredric abduct Esther. Mariah kills him before killing Doctor Fredric.

Fictional companies
Fictional assassins in comics
Sin City characters
Fictional organized crime groups
Fictional characters from Washington (state)
Characters created by Frank Miller (comics)